Ronald Teasley Sr (born January 26, 1927) is an American former Negro league outfielder.

Biography 
A native of Detroit, Michigan, Teasley attended Northwestern High School and Wayne State University, where he was a standout baseball and basketball player. He served in the US Navy in 1945 and 1946.

Teasley played with the New York Cubans in 1948 after being released by the Olean Oilers, a Brooklyn Dodgers farm club. He went on to play for the Carman Cardinals of the Mandak League in 1949 and 1950.

Teasley was inducted into the Wayne State University athletic hall of fame in 1986.

Personal life 
Teasley is a Catholic and attends St Moses the Black Catholic Church in Detroit.

References

External links
 and Seamheads
 Ron Teasley at Negro Leagues Baseball Museum

1927 births
New York Cubans players
Baseball outfielders
Baseball players from Detroit
Wayne State Warriors baseball players
United States Navy personnel of World War II
20th-century African-American sportspeople
Living people
21st-century African-American people
African-American Catholics